Sir Charles Wolseley, 2nd Baronet (c. 1630 – 9 October 1714), of Wolseley in Staffordshire, was an English politician who sat in the House of Commons at various times between 1653 and 1660. He held high office during the Commonwealth.

Life
Wolseley was the eldest son of Sir Robert Wolseley, who had been created a baronet by Charles I in 1628, and succeeded to the baronetcy on 21 September 1646. He entered Parliament as Member of Parliament for Oxfordshire in the nominated Barebones Parliament of 1653, and on the establishment of the Protectorate later the same year was appointed to the Council of State. He was subsequently elected for Staffordshire in the First and Second Parliaments of the Protectorate. In 1658, he was appointed to Cromwell's new Upper House. He represented Stafford in the Convention Parliament of 1660, and was pardoned at the Restoration. Thereafter he retired from public life, but published a number of pamphlets on ecclesiastical matters.

In 1685, Wolseley was arrested on suspicion of complicity in Monmouth's Rebellion, but was subsequently released.

He was buried in Westminster Abbey, and, unlike many of his contemporaries, not disinterred after the reformation. Dean Stanley describes his earthen grave in the southern portion of the Montpensier chapel.

Family
Wolseley married Ann Fiennes, youngest daughter of William, Viscount Saye and Sele and his wife Elizabeth Temple. They had seven sons and ten daughters:
 Robert Wolseley (died 1697), Envoy-Extraordinary to the Governor General of the Spanish Netherlands, died unmarried
 Charles Wolseley, died without issue
 Fiennes Wolseley, died young
 Sir William Wolseley, 3rd Baronet (c. 1660–1728), who as the oldest surviving son succeeded his father
 Sir Henry Wolseley, 4th Baronet (died 1730)
 Captain Richard Wolseley, father of Sir William Wolseley, 5th Baronet
 James Wolseley
 Elizabeth, who married Robert Somervile and was the mother of the poet William Somervile
 Mary, who married Richard Edwards
 Anne, who married John Berry
 Dorothy
 Bridget
 Penelope, died young
 Susan, who married Charles Wedgwood
 Penelope
 Frances
 Constance

References

 Concise Dictionary of National Biography (1930)
 Edward Kimber and Richard Johnson, The Baronetage of England (London, 1771) 
 Mark Noble, Memoirs of several persons and families... allied to or descended from... the Protectorate-House of Cromwell (Birmingham: Pearson & Rollason, 1784) 
 

|-

1630 births
1714 deaths
Wolseley, Charles, 2nd Baronet
Recipients of English royal pardons
Members of the Parliament of England (pre-1707) for Stafford
English MPs 1653 (Barebones)
English MPs 1654–1655
English MPs 1656–1658
English MPs 1660
Members of Cromwell's Other House